Mascotte is a city in Lake County, Florida, United States. As of the 2020 census, the population was 6,609, up from 5,101 in 2010. It is part of the Orlando–Kissimmee–Sanford Metropolitan Statistical Area.

Geography

History

The town is named for the Mascotte, a ship that was used to haul tobacco from Cuba during the Spanish–American War owned by Tampa civic booster Henry B. Plant. The ship appears on the seals of both Tampa and Mascotte. There are numerous photos of the Mascotte in service between Tampa, Key West and Havana, 1886 through 1924, until sold north.

Demographics

As of the census of 2013, there were 5,251 people, 803 households, and 634 families residing in the city. The racial makeup of the city was 67.03% White, 4.21% African American, 0.67% Native American, 0.48% Asian, 23.67% from other races, and 3.94% from two or more races. Hispanic or Latino of any race were 43.92% of the population.

There were 803 households, out of which 47.4% had children under the age of 18 living with them, 56.5% were married couples living together, 10.6% had a female householder with no husband present, and 21.0% were non-families. 12.6% of all households were made up of individuals, and 3.4% had someone living alone who was 65 years of age or older. The average household size was 3.33 and the average family size was 3.56.

In the city, the age distribution of the population shows 33.2% under the age of 18, 12.1% from 18 to 24, 33.1% from 25 to 44, 16.0% from 45 to 64, and 5.6% who were 65 years of age or older. The median age was 28 years. For every 100 females, there were 120.6 males. For every 100 females age 18 and over, there were 131.4 males.

The median income for a household in the city was $38,558, and the median income for a family was $40,483. Males had a median income of $24,139 versus $18,750 for females. The per capita income for the city was $12,346. About 10.8% of families and 15.7% of the population were below the poverty line, including 18.6% of those under age 18 and 10.4% of those age 65 or over.

References

External links

 City of Mascotte

Cities in Lake County, Florida
Greater Orlando
Cities in Florida